About 42 species of reptiles have been reported from the Kaziranga National Park, Assam, India. These include the endangered gharial and the rare Assam roofed turtle.

Two of the largest snakes in the world - the reticulated python and the rock python, as well as the longest venomous snake in the world - the king cobra are common inside the park. The park also contains Bengal monitor and water monitor populations. The park is home to the rare monocled cobra, as well as three of the Big Four - Indian cobra, Russell's viper and common krait.

In all, Kaziranga is home to 15 species of turtles, including the endemic Assam roofed turtle, and to one species of tortoise - the brown tortoise. A regional lizard species is also found in Kaziranga - the Assam garden lizard.

Crocodiles
 Gharial (Gavialis gangeticus)
The gharial (Gavialis gangeticus), (Hindi: घऱियाल, Marathi: सुसर Susar), also called Indian gavial or gavial, is the only surviving member of the once well-represented family Gavialidae, a long-established group of crocodilians with long, slender snouts. The gharial is listed as a critically endangered species by IUCN. The gharial is one of the three crocodilians found in India, the others being the mugger crocodile and the saltwater crocodile. It is one of the longest of all living crocodilians.

Turtles and tortoises
Assam roofed turtle (Kachuga sylhetensis)
Indian roofed turtle (Kachuga tecta)
Indian tent turtle (Kachuga tentoria)
Tricarinate hill turtle (Melanochelys tricarinata)
Indian eyed turtle (Morenia petersi)
Gangetic or Indian softshell turtle (Aspideretes gangeticus)
Indian peacock softshell turtle (Aspideretes hurum)
Narrow headed softshell turtle (Chitra indica)
Indian flapshell turtle (Lissemys punctata)
Oldham's leaf turtle (Cyclemys oldhami)
Indian black turtle (Melanochelys trijuga)
Keeled box turtle (Pyxidea mouhotii)
Brown hill tortoise (Manouria emys)
Malayan box turtle (Cuora amboinensis)
Spotted pond turtle (Geoclemys hamiltonii)
Brown roofed turtle (Kachuga smithii)

Lizards
Common Indian skink (Mabuya carinata) 
Assam olive-brown skink (Mabuya multifasciata)
Tuckto gecko (Gecko gecko)
Ticticky house gecko (Hemidactylus frenatus)
Common Bengal monitor (Varanus bengalensis)
Indian water monitor (Varanus salvator)
Assam greyish-brown gecko (Hemidactylus garnotii)
Light-olive Assam garden lizard (Calotes emma)
Assam garden lizard (Calotes maria)
Dotted garden skink (Lygosoma punctata)

Snakes
Black krait (Bungarus niger)
Bengal cobra (Naja kaouthia)
Common kukri snake (Oligodon arnensis)
Striped keelback (Amphiesma stolata)
Checkered keelback watersnake (Amphiesma stolata)
Common or long-nosed vine snake (Ahaetulla nasuta)
Rock python (Python molurus)
Reticulated python (Python reticulatus)
Copperhead trinket snake (Elaphe radiata)
Rat snake (Ptyas mucosus)
Common krait (Bungarus caeruleus)
Banded krait (Bungarus fasciatus)
King cobra (Ophiophagus hannah)
Russel's viper (Vipera russellii)
Pit vipers (Trimeresurus spp.)
Philippine cobra (Naja philippinensis)

References

External links
 Kaziranga National Park in UNESCO List
 Kaziranga Centenary 1905-2005
 World Conservation Monitoring Centre

Reptiles
Kaziranga
Kaziranga National Park